is a JR West station located in Niimi, Okayama Prefecture, Japan. It offers connecting service to the Geibi, Hakubi, and Kishin Lines.

History
1928-10-25: The completed Hakubi Line is opened.
1929-04-14: Sakubisai Line (which became the Kishin Line) section opened.
1930-02-10: The fork from Bitchū Kōjiro Station is opened with regular service to Niimi Station. 
1987-04-01: With the privatization of the Japanese National Railways, Niimi Station becomes a JR West station.

Station
The station uses the two-sided island style of platform, allowing for up to four lines to use the station at once (see the platform photos to the right). No freight trains pass through this station as it is designed to handle only passenger trains. Restrooms are located on the side of the station building. The automatic announcement system does not use the standard "The X train is arriving at platform Y." Instead, the announcement tells which line is arriving or departing. Tickets are handled using JR West's HeartStore.

Platforms
The platform island is connected to the station building via a tunnel, and the platform features a large enclosed waiting room in addition to the outside waiting area on the platform. Platforms 3 and 4 were renamed to 5 and 6. The various train lines served by Niimi Station are handled as follows:
Platforms 1 and 2: Kishin Line and Geibi Line
Platforms 5 and 6: Hakubi Line

Around the station

Services
The Niimi Post Office

Highway access
Niimi Interchange of the Chūgoku Expressway
Route 180
Route 182
Okayama/Tottori Prefectural Route 8, Niimi Nichinan Route
Okayama Prefectural Route 32, Niimi Katsuyama Route
Okayama Prefectural Route 199, Niimi Teishajō Route

Connecting lines
All lines are JR West lines.
Hakubi LineIshiga Station — Niimi Station — Nunohara Station — Bitchū Kōjiro Station
Kishin Line
Express: Osakabe Station — Tajibe Station — Iwayama Station — Niimi Station
Local: Iwayama Station — Niimi Station
Geibi Line
Express (one early morning train only): Niimi Station — Yagami Station
Local: Niimi Station — Nunohara Station

External links
 JR West

Geibi Line
Hakubi Line
Railway stations in Okayama Prefecture
Railway stations in Japan opened in 1928